Harry Gunnarsson (9 September 1929 – 22 March 2012) was a Swedish boxer. He competed in the men's welterweight event at the 1952 Summer Olympics.

References

1929 births
2012 deaths
Swedish male boxers
Olympic boxers of Sweden
Boxers at the 1952 Summer Olympics
Sportspeople from Gothenburg
Welterweight boxers
20th-century Swedish people